Chiloconger philippinensis is an eel in the family Congridae (conger/garden eels). It was described by David G. Smith and Emma Stanislavovna Karmovskaya in 2003. It is a tropical, marine eel which is known from the Philippines (from which its species epithet is derived), in the western central Pacific Ocean. It dwells at a depth range of 186–230 metres. Females can reach a total length of 19 centimetres.

References

Congridae
Fish described in 2003